Kimura Nova União is a set of Brazilian sports schools focused on Brazilian jiu-jitsu, submission wrestling and MMA with branches in Brazil, United States, Japan, Switzerland and Norway founded on 12 October 1993 in Natal, Rio Grande do Norte. Since November 1997, the school, that was called only Kimura, united with the Nova União and took its current name. It was champion of that World Cup of Jiu-Jitsu of 2004. Some of the notable students are Renan Barão, Ronny Markes and Gleison Tibau.

Notable Match Outcomes

Brazilian Jiu-Jitsu 
 First place in the Brazil North-Northeast Professional Jiu-Jitsu Championship (João Pessoa - State of Paraíba), 2011

MMA 

 18 wins of the athlete Renan Barão in UFC
 Silver medal of Marius Håkonsen in the 2015 European IMMAF MMA Championship
 Victory of Caio Alencar and Jussier Formiga in Shooto Brasil 25, 2011
 Victory of Ciro Bad Boy in the eighth edition of the Octagon Fight

References

External links 
 Official Page
 Tatame - Kimura Nova União é destaque em Natal

See also 
 Brazilian Jiu-Jitsu
 Jiu-jitsu
 Martial arts
 Mixed martial arts

Mixed martial arts in Brazil